Alexander Roosevelt. Hottordze is a Ghanaian politician and member of the Seventh Parliament of the Fourth Republic of Ghana representing the Central Tongu Constituency in the Volta Region on the ticket of the National Democratic Congress.

Early life and education 
Hottordze hails from Mafi- Kumase. He holds an M.B.A  from the Cape Coast University and an M.A from the University of Social Studies.

References 

1969 births
Living people
National Democratic Congress (Ghana) politicians
Ghanaian MPs 2017–2021
Ghanaian MPs 2021–2025